John Lavin (1856 – 1893) was a 19th-century professional baseball player.

References

External links

Major League Baseball outfielders
St. Louis Browns (AA) players
19th-century baseball players
Bay City (minor league baseball) players
Saginaw Greys players
Macon (minor league baseball) players
Birmingham (minor league baseball) players
Memphis Grays players
Binghamton Crickets (1880s) players
Milwaukee Brewers (minor league) players
Scranton Miners players
Oswego Starchboxes players
Jackson Jaxons players
Baseball players from New York (state)
1856 births
1893 deaths
Sportspeople from Troy, New York